Katsuhiko Kashiwazaki (born September 16, 1951, Kuji, Iwate) - Japanese judoka, champion and medalist of championships Japan and the world, author of books and one of the leading judo specialists in the world.

Biography 
Katsuhiko Kashiwazaki began to practice judo at the age of 10. His first coach was the 5th dan master of Shotaro Kubo. While in high school and before entering Tokai University train the future champion became the master Yuto Wayama. While studying at the University of Tokyo, preparation Katsuhiko Kashiwazaki became a two-time world champion in judo (in 1967 and 1973) and three-time Japanese champion Nobuyuki Sato. Three teachers became an example for Katsuhiko Kashiwazaki. He later noted that Shotaro Kubo taught him the spirit of judo, Yuto Wayama passed on the basics of neaza, and Nobuyuki Sato was an example of perseverance for him.

Master Nobuyuki Sato's Style influenced Kashiwazaki's projection tendency through throws and newaza. Indeed, Isao Okano notes Sato sensei's ability use hikkikomi gaeshi before taking control of your opponent on the ground. According to Kashiwazaki, his teacher also received the nickname "Newaza Sato" in connection with his military equipment.

Career 
One of the first international achievements of Kashiwazaki was not in judo, but in sambo. He won a silver medal at the European Open in Riga in 1972 in the category up to 62 kg. Sato Sensei won the gold medal, whom Katsuhiko Kashiwazaki accompanied at the event. He soon won the SAMBO World Championship in 1975 in the same weight category. He performed in the featherweight category (up to 65 kg). Champion (1975 and 1978-1980), silver (1976) and bronze (1974, 1982) medalist of the Japanese championships. Winner and medalist of international tournaments. Winner (1982) and bronze medalist (1978) of the international tournament in memory of JKanō Jigorō in Tokyo. Silver medalist at the 1975 World Championship in Vienna. At the 1981 World Championships in Maastricht, he climbed to the highest step of the podium.

After Kashiwazaki completed his competition, he moved to London to teach at Budokwai. There he met and became friends with the famous photographer Terence Donovan, who trained in the club and with whom they later wrote the book Fighting judo. Katsuhiko Kashiwazaki was later the national judo coach in Canada, Germany and other countries. Since 2009, he became head coach at Budo International University in Japan.

Achievements

Bibliography 
Katsuhiko Kashivazaki is the author of several books on judo, most of which ("Osaekomi", "Tomoenage", "Shimevaza", "Martial Judo") emphasize his thirst for shots and ground technicians Kodokan Judo.

Katsuhiko Kashiwazaki (1997), Osaekomi, Ippon USA, 
Katsuhiko Kashiwazaki (1992), Tomoe nage, Ippon Books, 
Katsuhiko Kashiwazaki (1992), Shimewaza, Ippon books, 
Katsuhiko Kashiwazaki, Hidetoshi Nakanishi (1992), Attacking Judo: A guide to combinations and counters, Ippon Books, 
Katsuhiko Kashiwazaki (1985), Fighting judo 

He is also the author of the introduction to the book "JUDO NEWAZA of Koji Komuro KOMLOCK" by judoist Koji Komuro, dedicated to ground technicians.

Links 
 Katsuhiko Kashiwazaki

References

External links
 

Japanese male judoka
Sportspeople from Iwate Prefecture
Tokai University alumni
1951 births
Living people